Uma Qala (Aymara uma water, qala stone, "water stone", also spelled Umajala) is a  mountain in the Andes of Peru. It is situated in the Arequipa Region, Condesuyos Province, Cayarani District. Uma Qala lies east of the mountain named Inka Misa. Inka Misa is also the name of the little lake at the feet of Uma Qala.

References 

Mountains of Peru
Mountains of Arequipa Region